Curling is a surname, and may refer to:

 Alvin Curling (born 1939), Canadian politician
 Dennis Curling, Welsh rugby union and rugby league player
 Henry Curling (1847–1910), British Army officer
 Rob Curling (born 1957), British television presenter and journalist
 Thomas Blizard Curling (1811–1888), British surgeon

See also 

 Curling
 Carling

English-language surnames
Surnames of English origin
Surnames of British Isles origin